Sky News Extra (formerly A-PAC  ; Australian Public Affairs Channel) is an Australian 24-hour cable and satellite public affairs news channel owned by Foxtel.

History

On 8 December 2008 it was announced that an Australian public affairs channel called A-SPAN (an acronym for Australian Subscription Public Affairs Network) would launch on 20 January 2009. The channel format is modelled on the American public affairs network C-SPAN. The news came after reports the ABC were considering launching a dedicated public affairs digital channel. Prior to launch the channel renamed as A-PAC (an acronym for Australian Public Affairs Channel). A-PAC is a not for profit independent channel funded by Austar and Foxtel, and produced by Sky News Australia.

The channel officially launched on the morning of 20 January 2009, with the inauguration of United States President Barack Obama airing on its first day, using a feed from U.S. cable channel C-SPAN.

Despite originally planned to occur on 26 April 2009, on 17 May 2009 A-PAC began broadcasting in 16:9 widescreen aspect ratio, along with sister channels Sky News Business Channel and Sky News Australia.

On 24 May 2012, Foxtel acquired Austar, which saw Foxtel become the sole stakeholder of A-PAC.

In February 2014, A-PAC had an on-air refresh, as well as launched a revamped website and a new weekly newsletter. In addition, Sky News presenter Helen Dalley was appointed as channel host.

In May 2018, A-PAC was rebranded to Sky News Extra and moved to channel 604 on Foxtel. The name and channel number change reflect on the additional programming it will have and to be in line with the other Sky News channels.

In March 2020, the channel was temporarily rebranded as Sky News COVID-19, as part of the networks' extended coverage of the ongoing 2019–20 coronavirus pandemic in Australia. The channel currently features a combination of live and pre-recorded news bulletins, press conferences and segments relating to COVID-19 across the nation.

Programming
Sky News Extra content features live broadcasts from Australia's Parliament House in Canberra (including sittings of the House of Representatives, the Senate, parliamentary Committee meetings and political press conferences), the parliaments of New South Wales, Victoria and Queensland as well as sittings of the United States Congress, live broadcasts of speeches from the Australian National Press Club and a program which provides coverage of the New Zealand, Canadian and British parliaments. Material from the United Nations and the European Parliament is also aired.

Availability
At launch Sky News Extra was available via satellite and cable television on channel 607; and was later made available by Internet streaming on its website, as well as on free-to-air digital television in Sydney as a trial. On 15 November 2009, Sky News Extra's channel location for Foxtel changed from Channel 607 to Channel 648.

From 1 May 2016, the service's linear channel was replaced by Sky News Election Channel, resulting in the service only being available on the Sky News Multiview service and online. Although the service was originally planned to relaunch as a linear channel on 30 November 2016, this was later postponed, and ultimately the linear channel did not return until 24 January 2017. The relaunch did, however, see Sky News Extra obtain Sky News Election Channel's HD feed, seeing the channel available in high definition for the first time.

References

External links
 

Television networks in Australia
Legislature broadcasters
Television channels and stations established in 2009
2009 establishments in Australia
Television channels and stations established in 2017
2017 establishments in Australia
English-language television stations in Australia
Extra
Foxtel